The Riyasat Parjamandal was an Indian political party active during the reign of Maharaja Bhupinder Singh of Patiala under British rule.

This party was headed by the President Sardar Sewa Singh Thikriwala and Vice President Sardar Ridha Singh Ji Akali Pannu of Ghagga.

Defunct political parties in India
Political parties with year of establishment missing
Political parties with year of disestablishment missing